Marte is a Spanish surname particularly common in the Dominican Republic. It is spelled the same as the planet Mars in Spanish, and does not have an accent é.
Notable persons with that name include:

 Alfonso Marte (born 1992), Dominican footballer
 Alfredo Marte (born 1989), Dominican baseball player
 Andy Marte (born 1983), Dominican baseball player
 Dámaso Marte (born 1975), Dominican baseball player
 Domenic Marte, American singer
 Jonathan de Marte (born 1993), Israeli-American baseball pitcher 
 José Marte (born 1996), Dominican baseball player
 Karen Marte, American slalom canoeist
 Ketel Marte (born 1993), Dominican baseball player
 Luis Marte (born 1986), American baseball player
 María Marte (born 1976), Dominican chef
 Starling Marte (born 1988), Dominican baseball player
 Víctor Marte (born 1980), Dominican baseball player
 Yunior Marte (born 1995), Dominican baseball player

Those with the surname Marté (with the accent é) include:
Daouda Marté (born 1959), Nigerien politician
Jefry Marté (born 1991), Dominican baseball player

See also
Martí, a similar Spanish surname